Salirhabdus salicampi is a Gram-positive, halotolerant, spore-forming, aerobic and motile bacterium from the genus of Salipaludibacillus which has been isolated from soil from a saltern from the Bigeum Island in Korea.

References

 

Bacillaceae
Bacteria described in 2017